Eric Daniel Brunson (born June 14, 1972) is an American basketball coach for the New York Knicks and former professional player. He played nine seasons in the National Basketball Association (NBA) and has also worked as an assistant coach for several teams. Brunson played college basketball for the Temple Owls.

Professional playing career
Born in Syracuse, New York, he attended Salem High School, becoming one of two McDonald's All-American from Massachusetts in 1991.
Brunson graduated from Temple University. Not drafted by any NBA team in 1995, he played for the Adelaide 36ers in Australia in 1995–96 for whom he was their season MVP, and in the CBA next season. He was signed as a free agent by the Portland Trail Blazers in 1997–98, playing again in the CBA at the start of the 1998–99 season. Brunson then signed with the New York Knicks, and was a member of the 1999 Eastern Conference championship team. In 2000–01, he started off with the Boston Celtics, but finished the season with the Knicks again. He rejoined the Trail Blazers in 2001–02. He then signed with the Chicago Bulls the next season, splitting between the Bulls and the Toronto Raptors in 2003–04, before moving on to the Los Angeles Clippers in 2004–05. A breakout season in which he averaged a career-high 5.5 points per game landed him a 2005–06 contract with the Seattle SuperSonics, but only appeared in four games due to injury. On February 28, 2006, the Sonics waived Brunson. He was subsequently signed by the Houston Rockets, with whom he finished his ninth and final season as a professional basketball player.

Coaching career
From January to April 2007, Brunson worked as an assistant coach with the Denver Nuggets, focusing on player development.  From 2007 to 2009, he was with the University of Virginia as the Cavaliers' director of basketball operations.  In May 2009, Brunson was hired as assistant coach for the Hartford Hawks men's basketball team. On September 9, 2010, Brunson was hired as an assistant coach for the Chicago Bulls.

During the 2012–13 season, Brunson served as an assistant coach to Mike Dunlap on the Charlotte Bobcats' staff.

Brunson was also an assistant coach with the Minnesota Timberwolves from 2016 to 2018. In May 2018, Brunson resigned amidst allegations made against him regarding misconduct toward women.

Brunson coached at Camden High School in Camden, New Jersey. He was Dajuan Wagner Jr.'s head coach. Brunson resigned prior to the 2020–21 season while Camden High was ranked the #7 team in the country, but changed his mind a couple days later and remained the coach until 2022.

On June 2, 2022, Brunson was hired by the New York Knicks as an assistant coach.

Personal life

Brunson met his wife, Sandra, at Temple University where he played for the Owls men's basketball team and she played volleyball. Rick went on to spend nine seasons in the NBA. The couple has two children: Jalen (born 1996) and Erica (born c. 2000/01). The family settled in Cherry Hill, New Jersey for much of his NBA career, but moved seven times before settling in Lincolnshire, Illinois, in 2010 where Jalen played his high school career for Adlai E. Stevenson High School before joining Villanova. Jalen was named the 2014 and 2015 Illinois Boys' Basketball Gatorade Player of the Year as a junior and senior, was named to the 2015 McDonald's All-American Boys Game roster, was named Illinois Mr. Basketball, and led his team to the 2015 Illinois High School Association Class 4A championship. Jalen is currently a player for the New York Knicks of the National Basketball Association (NBA).

Arrest
Brunson was arrested in June 2014 and indicted on charges of attempted criminal sexual assault, criminal sexual abuse, aggravated battery and domestic battery following an encounter with a massage therapist at a Lifetime Fitness in Vernon Hills. Authorities say Brunson used the name of retired NBA star Patrick Ewing to book an appointment in April with the massage therapist who had previously notified Brunson that she would no longer provide him with massages. Brunson pleaded not guilty to all charges. He later testified that the incident that led to the charges was a consensual act as part of an ongoing extramarital relationship. He was eventually acquitted.

References

External links

Profile at Virginiasports.com

1972 births
Living people
Adelaide 36ers players
African-American basketball coaches
African-American basketball players
American expatriate basketball people in Australia
American expatriate basketball people in Canada
American expatriate basketball people in Italy
American men's basketball players
Basketball coaches from New York (state)
Basketball players from Syracuse, New York
Boston Celtics players
Charlotte Bobcats assistant coaches
Chicago Bulls assistant coaches
Chicago Bulls players
Connecticut Pride players
Hartford Hawks men's basketball coaches
High school basketball coaches in New Jersey
Houston Rockets players
Indiana Pacers players
Los Angeles Clippers players
McDonald's High School All-Americans
Minnesota Timberwolves assistant coaches
New York Knicks players
Orlando Magic players
People acquitted of sex crimes
People from Cherry Hill, New Jersey
Philadelphia 76ers players
Point guards
Portland Trail Blazers players
Quad City Thunder players
Seattle SuperSonics players
Sportspeople from Camden County, New Jersey
Temple Owls men's basketball players
Toronto Raptors players
Undrafted National Basketball Association players
Salem High School (Massachusetts) alumni
American expatriate basketball people in the Philippines
Barangay Ginebra San Miguel players
Philippine Basketball Association imports
21st-century African-American sportspeople
20th-century African-American sportspeople